

Mērsrags Lighthouse (Latvian: Mērsraga bāka) - a lighthouse located on the Bay of Riga, on the Latvian coast of the Baltic Sea. It is located on a headland, stretching as a cape into the Bay of Riga, by a stony shoal.

History
The lighthouse was built in 1875, and is called the Frenchwoman,  as the lens, an invention of the French, is used as its signal. The lighthouse was devastated in World War I, when its metal structure was distorted by a fire. The current lighthouse was built in 1922, and is strengthened by eight wrought iron inserts, with the exterior walls sheathed with riveted metal plating.

See also
 List of lighthouses in Latvia

References

External links

Lighthouses completed in 1875
Resort architecture in Latvia
Lighthouses in Latvia